Glencoe is a historic home and resort complex located at Glencoe, Baltimore County, Maryland. It consists if a complex of Italianate-influenced domestic buildings and structures, clustered around a square, two-story frame dwelling. The house features a broad porch, which wraps around two sides with an iron-railed deck atop the porch. Four interior brick chimneys rise around a central observation deck. The property also includes a two-story, mansard roofed stable / carriage house, a smokehouse, ice house, sheep shed, garden house (probably a former chicken house), and a latticed frame gazebo. It was built in 1851-1856 as a private residence, but was subsequently developed as a summer resort.

It was listed on the National Register of Historic Places in 1983.

References

External links
, including photo from 1976, at Maryland Historical Trust

Houses on the National Register of Historic Places in Maryland
Houses in Baltimore County, Maryland
Houses completed in 1856
Italianate architecture in Maryland
National Register of Historic Places in Baltimore County, Maryland